James Burgess Greene (April 8, 1876 – June 30, 1962) was an American swimmer. He competed in the men's 1500 metre freestyle event at the 1908 Summer Olympics.

References

External links
 

1876 births
1962 deaths
Olympic swimmers of the United States
Swimmers at the 1908 Summer Olympics
Place of birth missing
American male freestyle swimmers
19th-century American people
20th-century American people